In mathematics, an algebraic surface is an algebraic variety of dimension two. In the case of geometry over the field of complex numbers, an algebraic surface has complex dimension two (as a complex manifold, when it is non-singular) and so of dimension four as a smooth manifold.

The theory of algebraic surfaces is much more complicated than that of algebraic curves (including the compact Riemann surfaces, which are genuine surfaces of (real) dimension two).  Many results were obtained, however, in the Italian school of algebraic geometry, and are up to 100 years old.

Classification by the Kodaira dimension 

In the case of dimension one varieties are classified by only the topological genus, but dimension two, the difference between the arithmetic genus  and the geometric genus  turns to be important because we cannot distinguish birationally only the topological genus. Then we introduce the irregularity for the classification of them. A summary of the results (in detail, for each kind of surface refers to each redirection), follows:

Examples of algebraic surfaces include (κ is the Kodaira dimension):

 κ = −∞: the projective plane, quadrics in P3, cubic surfaces, Veronese surface, del Pezzo surfaces, ruled surfaces
 κ = 0 : K3 surfaces, abelian surfaces, Enriques surfaces, hyperelliptic surfaces
 κ = 1: elliptic surfaces
 κ = 2: surfaces of general type.

For more examples see the list of algebraic surfaces.

The first five examples are in fact birationally equivalent. That is, for example, a cubic surface has a function field isomorphic to that of the projective plane, being the rational functions in two indeterminates. The Cartesian product of two curves also provides examples.

Birational geometry of surfaces 
The birational geometry of algebraic surfaces is rich, because of blowing up (also known as a monoidal transformation), under which a point is replaced by the curve of all limiting tangent directions coming into it (a projective line). Certain curves may also be blown down, but there is a restriction (self-intersection number must be −1).

Castelnuovo's Theorem 
One of the fundamental theorems for the birational geometry of surfaces is Castelnuovo's theorem. This states that any birational map between algebraic surfaces is given by a finite sequence of blowups and blowdowns.

Properties 

The Nakai criterion says that:
A Divisor D on a surface S is ample if and only if D2 > 0 and for all irreducible curve C on S D•C > 0.

Ample divisors have a nice property such as it is the pullback of some hyperplane bundle of projective space, whose properties are very well known. Let  be the abelian group consisting of all the divisors on S. Then due to the intersection theorem

is viewed as a quadratic form. Let

then  becomes to be a numerical equivalent class group of S and

For an ample line bundle H on S, the definition

is used in the surface version of the Hodge index theorem:
This theorem is proven using the Nakai criterion and the Riemann-Roch theorem for surfaces. The Hodge index theorem is used in Deligne's proof of the Weil conjecture.

Basic results on algebraic surfaces include the Hodge index theorem, and the division into five groups of birational equivalence classes called the classification of algebraic surfaces. The general type class, of Kodaira dimension 2, is very large (degree 5 or larger for a non-singular surface in P3 lies in it, for example).

There are essential three Hodge number invariants of a surface. Of those, h1,0 was classically called the irregularity and denoted by q; and h2,0 was called the geometric genus pg. The third, h1,1, is not a birational invariant, because blowing up can add whole curves, with classes in H1,1. It is known that Hodge cycles are algebraic, and that algebraic equivalence coincides with homological equivalence, so that h1,1 is an upper bound for ρ, the rank of the Néron-Severi group. The arithmetic genus p''a is the difference

geometric genus − irregularity.

In fact this explains why the irregularity got its name, as a kind of 'error term'.

Riemann-Roch theorem for surfaces 

The Riemann-Roch theorem for surfaces was first formulated by Max Noether. The families of curves on surfaces can be classified, in a sense, and give rise to much of their interesting geometry.

References

External links 
 Free program SURFER to visualize algebraic surfaces in real-time, including a user gallery.
 SingSurf an interactive 3D viewer for algebraic surfaces.
 Page on Algebraic Surfaces started in 2008
 Overview and thoughts on designing Algebraic surfaces